The Fred and Rosa Fulton Barn is a historic building located north of Selma, Iowa, United States in rural Jefferson County.  The barn was built by Rosa from plans prepared by the Louden Machinery Company of Fairfield, Iowa.  It is a good example of the company's Gothic laminated roof design.  The barn also includes other Louden-manufactured devices, including "Master-Made" ventilator windows, metal roof aerators, hay carrier and fork, and door tracks and trolleys. This equipment is original to the barn's construction in 1947.  Built for a dairy operation, the structure has subsequently been used for general farm purposes.  The barn was listed on the National Register of Historic Places in 1999.

It sports a hay hood.

References

Infrastructure completed in 1947
Buildings and structures in Jefferson County, Iowa
National Register of Historic Places in Jefferson County, Iowa
Barns on the National Register of Historic Places in Iowa
Barns with hay hoods